Stoke City F.C. is an English association football club based in Stoke-on-Trent, Staffordshire. The club was formed in 1863 as Stoke Ramblers F.C., and played their first competitive match in November 1883, when they entered the First Round of the 1883–84 FA Cup. In 1888 they joined the inaugural Football League thus becoming founding members. The club was renamed Stoke City F.C. in 1925, and they moved to Britannia Stadium in 1997. Since playing their first competitive match, more than 1000 players have made a competitive first-team appearance for the club, many of whom have played under 25 matches (including substitute appearances); those players are listed here.

List of players
Appearances and goals are for first-team competitive matches only, including Premier League, Football League, Football Alliance, Birmingham & District League, Southern League, FA Cup, League Cup, League Trophy, UEFA Cup/UEFA Europa League, Anglo-Italian Cup, Birmingham League Cup, Full Members' Cup, United Counties League, Texaco Cup and Watney Cup. Wartime matches are regarded as unofficial and are excluded.
The list is ordered first by number of appearances in total.
Highlighted players members of the current squad.

Statistics correct as of match played 18 March 2023

Table headers
 Nationality – If a player played international football, the country/countries he played for are shown. Otherwise, the player's nationality is given as their country of birth.
 Stoke City career – The year of the player's first appearance for Stoke City to the year of his last appearance.
 Starts – The number of games started.
 Sub – The number of games played as a substitute.
 Total – The total number of games played, both as a starter and as a substitute.

Notes
 A utility player is one who is considered to play in more than one position.

References
 
 

 
Players (1-25 appearances)
Stoke City
Association football player non-biographical articles